Historic Brookhaven is a historic neighborhood, part of which lies in Atlanta's Buckhead Community, part of which lies in Sandy Springs, Georgia, and part of which lies in city of Brookhaven, Georgia, to which it lends its name. Capital City Club country club is at the center of the neighborhood, and it is surrounded by valuable homes, many of which were designed by a number of well-known Atlanta architects of the pre-war period. The neighborhood boundaries are well defined, and it stretches from Peachtree Dunwoody Road to the west, Windsor Parkway to the north, Mabry Drive to the east, and Peachtree Road to the south.

Historic Brookhaven has perpetually been one of metropolitan Atlanta's wealthiest neighborhoods. As of 2010, it has a median household income of $236,393.

References

Neighborhoods in Atlanta
Neighborhoods in DeKalb County, Georgia
Sandy Springs, Georgia
Brookhaven, Georgia
Historic districts on the National Register of Historic Places in Georgia (U.S. state)
National Register of Historic Places in DeKalb County, Georgia